Nabunturan, officially the Municipality of Nabunturan, is a 1st class municipality and capital of the province of Davao de Oro, Philippines. According to the 2020 census, it has a population of 84,340 people.

The municipality is home to the Mainit Hot Springs Protected Landscape.

History

The town of Nabunturan was once a barangay of Municipality of Compostela. The origin of the name is from buntod, the Cebuano term for "mountain."  The word "Nabunturan" means "surrounded by mountains" in English. The early settlement was governed by a headman called Bagani, but was under the supervision of the Municipal District President of Compostela over matters concerning civil affairs. For the maintenance of peace and order, the area was under the immediate supervision of the Philippine Constabulary Detachment of Camp Kalaw, Moncayo. From barangay Jaguimitan in the north to barangay Mawab (now a municipality in the south), the whole Compostela town was divided into two (2) municipal districts: the district of Moncayo, and the district of Compostela, with the latter's seat of local government in barangay Nabunturan, now the municipality of Nabunturan.

Before the construction of the national road traversing Nabunturan, the place was little known; but despite the threat of malaria, which was prevalent at the time, pioneers ventured into the area. Mansaka natives settled their lives here in the municipality of Mawab to Barangay Bangkerohan, Montevista. The original site of Barangay Nabunturan was situated along the Libasan-Saosao Provincial Road, about 4 km from the present Poblacion site. The public school system was under the supervision of the Supervising Teacher stationed in the Kalaw Settlement for schools in the district of Monkayo.

When the road was constructed in 1938, many Visayan settlers and pioneers came to Nabunturan and made it their home. By that time, the establishment of the Bureau of Public Works (BPW) camp settled in Nabunturan. Many business trades and establishments poured in and Nabunturan was established as a rural community.

In 1941, the Second World War broke out in the country. A new hiding place for guerrillas and USAFFE Contingents spread in Nabunturan. But during the Japanese occupation in Mindanao, Nabunturan became a Japanese Kempetai Garrison. After the war, the Japanese were repulsed back to Davao City, and the camp regained its status as the center of life and business in Davao de Oro. Camp Kalaw was destroyed and abandoned.

In 1945, American forces landed in Davao City, and the Philippine Civil Assistance Unit (PCAU) established the civil government of Compostela at Nabunturan because of its accessibility to Davao City.  By that time, many highways and roads were constructed, and Nabunturan became a center of commerce. Because of this, the need to convert Nabunturan to a municipality was felt.  On July 23, 1957, 30 days after the approval and passage of Republic Act no. 2038, a new political unit—separate and distinct from the mother municipality of Compostela—was created. It retained its original name, Nabunturan. The first mayor of the town was Lauro C. Arabejo, the incumbent mayor of the municipality of Compostela.

On January 30, 1998, President Fidel V. Ramos signed into law the creation of the 79th province of the country, Compostela Valley (now named Davao de Oro), pursuant to Rep. Act 8470, which created Nabunturan as its capital town on March 8, 1998. Prospero Amatong, then incumbent governor of Davao del Norte province from which the new province of Compostela Valley was carved out, opted to serve as the first governor of the newly created province. He only served for one day because he resigned the following day and filed his candidacy for Congress. He was succeeded by Luz Sarmiento as an appointed governor and served for two months. The first elected governor was Jose R. Caballero who served from July 1, 1998, to June 30, 2007.  The present Mayor of Nabunturan is MYROCEL CLARIN-BALILI.

Geography

Climate

Barangays

Nabunturan is subdivided into 28 barangays, namely:

Demographics

Economy 

Nabunturan is also home to the biggest gold ring in the Philippines, "The Solidarity Ring."
Malls:
Nabunturan Central Warehouse
Gaisano Grand Mall - Nabunturan
NCCC Mall Davao - NCCC Nabunturan

Government

List of former chief executives

Media

Radio stations and cable provider 
 DXPA-FM 103.1 Radyo Serbisyo – Owned By Andres Bonifacio College Broadcasting System
 DXWH-FM 104.7 Radyo Natin – Owned by Manila Broadcasting Company ( operator .      AJT production and media services )
 DXKY-FM 88.5 Zradio – Owned by 1st District Congressman Manuel "Way Kurat" Zamora  under the license by RMC Broadcasting Corporation of the Radyo ni Juan Network
 Nabunturan Cable TV Network (NCTN) – owned By Jainal B. Uy
 97.9 afm nabunturan owned by mr alexander petalcorin agustin

References

External links 
 Nabunturan Profile at the DTI Cities and Municipalities Competitive Index
 [ Philippine Standard Geographic Code]
 Philippine Census Information

Municipalities of Davao de Oro
Provincial capitals of the Philippines